Yu Yokoya (18??-1967) was a Japanese marine biologist. He worked at least after 1917 on Japanese decapod crustaceans for the Fisheries Institute, Faculty of Agriculture, Tokyo Imperial Univ.

Works
 Some Rare and New Species of Decapod Crustaceans Found in the Vicinity of the Misaki Marine Biological Station
 1933 - On the distribution of decapod crustaceans inhabiting the continental shelf around Japan, chiefly based upon the materials collected by S.S. Soyo-Maru, during the year 1923–1930. Journal of the College of Agriculture, Tokyo Imperial University, 12 (1): 1–226.

Tributes
The cephalopod name Loligo yokoyai M. Ishikawa, 1925 may possibly be in his honour. The thalassinidean name Upogebia yokoyai Makarov, 1938? is also in his honour.

References

Japanese marine biologists
1967 deaths
Year of birth missing